= Whateverland =

2022 video game

- Developer: Caligari Games
- Publishers: Caligari Games, WhisperGames
- Platforms: Windows; PlayStation 4; PlayStation 5; Xbox One; Xbox Series X/S; Nintendo Switch
- Release: September 16, 2022
- Genres: Adventure, point-and-click, puzzle game
- Mode: Single player

Whateverland is a point-and-click adventure video game developed and published by Russian studio Caligari Games in collaboration with Whisper Games. It was initially released for Windows on September 16, 2022. Versions for PlayStation 4, PlayStation 5, Xbox One, Xbox Series X/S and Nintendo Switch were released on September 22, 2023.

The story follows Vincent, a thief who steals a treasured necklace from a powerful witch named Beatrice, and gets sent to the world of Whateverland, which is described as a "magical prison", where time is stopped and inhabitants live forever. Throughout the story, Vincent will meet various characters, solving puzzles, quests and exploring the world of Whateverland, in order to find a way out from it.

== Gameplay and plot ==
The game begins as the player finds Vincent trapped in a refrigerator, located at a junkyard, where the player meets Nick, a local writer, who tells Vincent that the witch can be summoned with a spell that is now divided into 7 parts, that are owned by the first prisoners of Whateverland. Nick becomes Vincent's companion, and then they decide to seek for the spell's parts in order to convince the witch to give freedom to Vincent.

After meeting with all 8 owners of 7 pieces of the spell, the player will be allowed to choose to summon the witch and try to leave the Whateverland, or stay in Whateverland forever. If the player followed the good path, the player can choose to leave the Whateverland, then the witch appears and says that she is impressed by Vincent's skills, therefore she allows him to leave. If the player followed the bad path, after summoning the witch she offers Vincent a puzzle to solve. If the player succeeds, then they can leave the Whateverland. Depending on the path and further choice in the final dialogue, at the end of the game Nick will tell the player about the life in Whateverland after Vincent's choice, where in bad ending he starts his story with "not much has changed in Whateverland", while in good ending he starts with "Whateverland has changed a great deal during this time".

During the game, the player is allowed to choose between "good" - friendly, polite style - and "bad" - sneaky, apathetic style - while interacting with other characters, and depending on the player's choices, the game's ending will be different. Aside from different puzzles, the player will be prompted to play a "board" game called Bell and Bones, where on a chessboard the player's goal is to bring the ball to one of three locations through controlling their figures.

== Reception ==
The game received highly positive reviews on Steam, despite not receiving much global attention. Some journalists stated that they were willing to play the game more than once, some also seen the game as inspired by Tim Burton's works. Russian journal VGTimes pointed that the game's soundtrack creates fitting atmosphere for the world of Whateverland, and that the game's art style "combines a wide variety of details and features".
